Babette Anne Brumback is an American biostatistician known for her work on causal inference. She is a professor of biostatistics at the University of Florida.

Education and career
Brumback earned a bachelor's degree in electrical engineering at the University of Virginia in 1988. She went to the University of California, Berkeley for graduate study, originally in electrical engineering and computer science but then switching to statistics; she earned a master's degree in 1992 and completed her Ph.D. in 1996. Her dissertation, Statistical Methods for Hormone Data, was supervised by John A. Rice.

After postdoctoral research at Harvard University she became an assistant professor of biostatistics at the University of Washington in 1999, and while there also became affiliated with the Fred Hutchinson Cancer Research Center. She moved to the University of California, Los Angeles in 2002 and again to the University of Florida in 2004.

Service
Brumback chaired the Statistics in Epidemiology Section of the American Statistical Association for the 2015 term. She was president of the Florida Chapter of the American Statistical Association for 2015–2016.

Recognition
Brumback was elected as a Fellow of the American Statistical Association in 2019.

References

External links
Home page

Year of birth missing (living people)
Living people
American women statisticians
Biostatisticians
University of Virginia School of Engineering and Applied Science alumni
UC Berkeley College of Letters and Science alumni
University of Washington faculty
UCLA School of Public Health faculty
University of Florida faculty
Fellows of the American Statistical Association
American women scientists
American women academics
21st-century American women